The Central District of Konarak County is a district (bakhsh) in Konarak County, Sistan and Baluchestan province, Iran. At the 2006 census, its population was 53,113, in 10,928 families.  The district has one city: Konarak. The district has two rural districts (dehestan): Jahliyan Rural District and Kahir Rural District.

References 

Konarak County
Districts of Sistan and Baluchestan Province